The economy of Angola remains heavily influenced by the effects of four decades of conflict in the last part of the 20th century, the war for independence from Portugal (1961–75) and the subsequent civil war (1975–2002). Despite extensive oil and gas resources, diamonds, hydroelectric potential, and rich agricultural land, Angola remains poor, and a third of the population relies on subsistence agriculture. Since 2002, when the 27-year civil war ended, government policy prioritized the repair and improvement of infrastructure and strengthening of political and social institutions. During the first decade of the 21st century, Angola's economy was one of the fastest-growing in the world, with reported annual average GDP growth of 11.1 percent from 2001 to 2010. High international oil prices and rising oil production contributed to strong economic growth, although with high inequality, at that time.

Corruption is rife throughout the economy and the country remains heavily dependent on the oil sector, which in 2017 accounted for over 90 percent of exports by value and 64 percent of government revenue. With the end of the oil boom, from 2015 Angola entered into a period of economic contraction.

History

The Angolan economy has been dominated by the production of raw materials and the use of cheap labor since European rule began in the sixteenth century. The Portuguese used Angola principally as a source for the thriving slave trade across the Atlantic; Luanda became the greatest slaving port in Africa. After the Portuguese Empire abolished the slave trade in Angola in 1858, it began using concessional agreements, granting exclusive rights to a private company to exploit land, people, and all other resources within a given territory. In Mozambique, this policy spawned a number of companies notorious for their exploitation of local labor. But in Angola, only Diamang showed even moderate success. At the same time, Portuguese began emigrating to Angola to establish farms and plantations (fazendas) to grow cash crops for export. Although these farms were only partially successful before World War II, they formed the basis for the later economic growth.

The principal exports of the post-slave economy in the 19th century were rubber, beeswax, and ivory. Prior to the First World War, exportation of coffee, palm kernels and oil, cattle, leather and hides, and salt fish joined the principal exports, with small quantities of gold and cotton also being produced. Grains, sugar, and rum were also produced for local consumption. The principal imports were foodstuffs, cotton goods, hardware, and British coal. Legislation against foreign traders was implemented in the 1890s. The territory's prosperity, however, continued to depend on plantations worked by labor "indentured" from the interior.

Before World War II, the Portuguese government was concerned primarily with keeping its colonies self-sufficient and therefore invested little capital in Angola's local economy. It built no roads until the mid-1920s, and the first railroad, the Benguela Railway, was not completed until 1929. Between 1900 and 1940, only 35,000 Portuguese emigrants settled in Angola, and most worked in commerce in the cities, facilitating trade with Portugal. In the rural areas, Portuguese settlers often found it difficult to make a living because of fluctuating world prices for sugarcane and sisal and the difficulties in obtaining cheap labor to farm their crops. As a result, they often suspended their operations until the market prices rose and instead marketed the produce of Angolan farmers.

But in the wake of World War II, the rapid growth of industrialization worldwide and the parallel requirements for raw materials led Portugal to develop closer ties with its colonies and to begin actively developing the Angolan economy. In the 1930s, Portugal started to develop closer trade ties with its colonies, and by 1940 it absorbed 63 percent of Angolan exports and accounted for 47 percent of Angolan imports, up from 39 percent and 37 percent, respectively, a decade earlier. When the price of Angola's principal crops—coffee and sisal—jumped after the war, the Portuguese government began to reinvest some profits inside the country, initiating a series of projects to develop infrastructure. During the 1950s, Portugal built dams, hydroelectric power stations, and transportation systems. In addition, Portuguese citizens were encouraged to emigrate to Angola, where planned settlements (colonatos) were established for them in the rural areas. Finally, the Portuguese initiated mining operations for iron ore, manganese, and copper to complement industrial activities at home, and in 1955 the first successful oil wells were drilled in Angola. By 1960 the Angolan economy had been completely transformed, boasting a successful commercial agricultural sector, a promising mineral and petroleum production enterprise, and an incipient manufacturing industry.

Yet by 1976, these encouraging developments had been reversed. The economy was in complete disarray in the aftermath of the war of independence and the subsequent internal fighting of the liberation movements. According to the ruling MPLA-PT, in August 1976 more than 80 percent of the agricultural plantations had been abandoned by their Portuguese owners; only 284 out of 692 factories continued to operate; more than 30,000 medium-level and high-level managers, technicians, and skilled workers had left the country; and 2,500 enterprises had been closed (75 percent of which had been abandoned by their owners). Furthermore, only 8,000 vehicles remained out of 153,000 registered, dozens of bridges had been destroyed, the trading network was disrupted, administrative services did not exist, and files and studies were missing.

Angola's economic ills can also be traced to the legacy of Portuguese colonial development. Many of the white settlers had come to Angola after 1950 and were understandably quick to repatriate during the war of independence. During their stay, however, these settlers had appropriated Angolan lands, disrupting local peasant production of cash and subsistence crops. Moreover, Angola's industries depended on trade with Portugal—the colony's overwhelmingly dominant trade partner—for both markets and machinery. Only the petroleum and diamond industries boasted a wider clientele for investment and markets. Most important, the Portuguese had not trained Angolans to operate the larger industrial or agricultural enterprises, nor had they actively educated the population. Upon independence Angola thus found itself without markets or expertise to maintain even minimal economic growth.

As a result, the government intervened, nationalizing most businesses and farms abandoned by the Portuguese. It established state farms to continue producing coffee, sugar, and sisal, and it took over the operations of all factories to maintain production. These attempts usually failed, primarily because of the lack of experienced managers and the continuing disruptions in rural areas caused by the UNITA insurgency. Only the petroleum sector continued to operate successfully, and by 1980 this sector had helped the gross domestic product reach US$3.6 billion, its highest level up to 1988. In the face of serious economic problems and the continuing war throughout the countryside, in 1987 the government announced plans to liberalize economic policies and promote private investment and involvement in the economy.

1990s
United Nations Angola Verification Mission III and MONUA spent US$1.5 billion overseeing implementation of the Lusaka Protocol, a 1994 peace accord that ultimately failed to end the civil war. The protocol prohibited UNITA from buying foreign arms, a provision the United Nations largely did not enforce, so both sides continued to build up their stockpile. UNITA purchased weapons in 1996 and 1997 from private sources in Albania and Bulgaria, and from Zaire, South Africa, Republic of the Congo, Zambia, Togo, and Burkina Faso. In October 1997 the UN imposed travel sanctions on UNITA leaders, but the UN waited until July 1998 to limit UNITA's exportation of diamonds and freeze UNITA bank accounts. While the U.S. government gave US$250 million to UNITA between 1986 and 1991, UNITA made US$1.72 billion between 1994 and 1999 exporting diamonds, primarily through Zaire to Europe. At the same time the Angolan government received large amounts of weapons from the governments of Belarus, Brazil, Bulgaria, China, and South Africa. While no arms shipment to the government violated the protocol, no country informed the U.N. Register on Conventional Weapons as required.

Despite the increase in civil warfare in late 1998, the economy grew by an estimated 4% in 1999. The government introduced new currency denominations in 1999, including a 1 and 5 kwanza note.

2000s
An economic reform effort was launched in 1998. Angola ranked 160 of 174 nations in the United Nations Human Development Index in 2000. In April 2000 Angola started an International Monetary Fund (IMF) Staff-Monitored Program (SMP). The program formally lapsed in June 2001, but the IMF remains engaged. In this context the Government of Angola has succeeded in unifying exchange rates and has raised fuel, electricity, and water rates. The Commercial Code, telecommunications law, and Foreign Investment Code are being modernized. A privatization effort, prepared with World Bank assistance, has begun with the BCI bank. Nevertheless, a legacy of fiscal mismanagement and corruption persists. The civil war internally displaced 3.8 million people, 32% of the population, by 2001. The security brought about by the 2002 peace settlement has led to the resettlement of 4 million displaced persons, thus resulting in large-scale increases in agriculture production.

In 2004, China's Eximbank approved a $2 billion line of credit to Angola to rebuild infrastructure. The economy grew 18% in 2005 and growth was expected to reach 26% in 2006 and stay above 10% for the rest of the decade. By 2020, Angola had a national debt of $76 billion, of which $20 billion is to China.

The construction industry is taking advantage of the growing economy, with various housing projects stimulated by the government initiatives for example the Angola Investe program and the Casa Feliz or Meña projects. Not all public construction projects are functional. A case in point: Kilamba Kiaxi, where a whole new satellite town of Luanda, consisting of housing facilities for several hundreds of thousands of people, was completely uninhabited for over four years because of skyrocketing prices, but completely sold out after the government decreased the original price and created mortgage plans at around the election time thus made it affordable for middle-class people. 
Angola joined the Organization of the Petroleum Exporting Countries on January 1, 2007. Cabinda Gulf Oil Company found Malange-1, an oil reservoir in Block 14, on August 9, 2007.

Overview

Despite its abundant natural resources, output per capita is among the world's lowest. Subsistence agriculture provides the main livelihood for 85% of the population. Oil production and the supporting activities are vital to the economy, contributing about 45% to GDP and 90% of exports. Control of the oil industry is consolidated in Sonangol Group, a conglomerate owned by the Angolan government. With revenues booming from oil exports, the government has started to implement ambitious development programs to build roads and other basic infrastructure for the nation.

In the last decade of the colonial period, Angola was a major African food exporter but now imports almost all its food. Severe wartime conditions, including extensive planting of landmines throughout the countryside, have brought agricultural activities to a near-standstill. Some efforts to recover have gone forward, however, notably in fisheries. Coffee production, though a fraction of its pre-1975 level, is sufficient for domestic needs and some exports. Diamonds provided much of the revenue for Jonas Savimbi's UNITA rebellion through illicit trade. Other rich resources await development: gold, forest products, fisheries, iron ore, coffee, and fruits.

This is a chart of trend of nominal gross domestic product of Angola at market prices using International Monetary Fund data; figures are in millions of units.

The following table shows the main economic indicators in 1980–2017. Inflation below 5% is in green.

Agriculture
Angola produced, in 2018:

 8.6 million tons of cassava (8th largest producer in the world);
 3.5 million tons of banana (7th largest producer in the world, or the 10th largest, if we consider together with plantain);
 2.2 million tons of maize;
 1.2 million tons of sweet potato (10th largest producer in the world);
 806 thousand tons of potato;
 597 thousand tons of pineapple (13th largest producer in the world);
 572 thousand tons of sugarcane;
 355 thousand tons of cabbage;
 314 thousand tons of beans;
 280 thousand tons of palm oil;
 154 thousand tons of peanut;

In addition to smaller productions of other agricultural products, like coffee (16 thousand tons).

Foreign trade

Exports in 2004 reached US$10,530,764,911. The vast majority of Angola's exports, 92% in 2004, are petroleum products. US$785 million worth of diamonds, 7.5% of exports, were sold abroad that year. Nearly all of Angola's oil goes to the United States,  in 2006, making it the eighth largest supplier of oil to the United States, and to China,  in 2006. In the first quarter of 2008, Angola became the main exporter of oil to China. The rest of its petroleum exports go to Europe and Latin America. U.S. companies account for more than half the investment in Angola, with Chevron-Texaco leading the way. The U.S. exports industrial goods and services, primarily oilfield equipment, mining equipment, chemicals, aircraft, and food, to Angola, while principally importing petroleum. Trade between Angola and South Africa exceeded US$300 million in 2007. From the 2000s, many Chinese have settled and started up businesses.

Resources

Petroleum

Angola produces and exports more petroleum than any other nation in sub-Saharan Africa, surpassing Nigeria first in the 2000s, then in 2022. In January 2007 Angola became a member of OPEC. Under the Lourenço since 2017, the country has made efforts to incentive investments and reverse declining production, resulting in fresh investments made by international oil companies.

Chevron Corporation, TotalEnergies., ExxonMobil, Eni, and BP all operate in the country and represent a vast majority of daily productio.

Block 17, operated by TotalEnergies, is Angola's biggest producing asset and is known as the Golden Block. The French major is currently executing several subsea tieback projects there, including CLOV 3 and Begonia, whose final investment decisions (FIDs) were taken in 2022.

The United Nations has criticized the Angolan government for using torture, rape, summary executions, arbitrary detention, and disappearances, actions which Angolan government has justified on the need to maintain oil output.

Angola is the third-largest trading partner of the United States in Sub-Saharan Africa, largely because of its petroleum exports. The U.S. imports 7% of its oil from Angola, about three times as much as it imported from Kuwait just prior to the Gulf War in 1991. The U.S. Government has invested US$4 billion in Angola's petroleum sector.

Oil makes up over 90% of Angola's exports.

Diamonds

Angola is the third largest producer of diamonds in Africa and has only explored 40% of the diamond-rich territory within the country, but has had difficulty in attracting foreign investment because of corruption, human rights violations, and diamond smuggling. Production rose by 30% in 2006 and Endiama, the national diamond company of Angola, expects production to increase by 8% in 2007 to 10 million carats annually. The government is trying to attract foreign companies to the provinces of Bié, Malanje and Uíge.

The Angolan government loses $375 million annually from diamond smuggling. In 2003, the government began Operation Brilliant, an anti-smuggling investigation that arrested and deported 250,000 smugglers between 2003 and 2006. Rafael Marques, a journalist and human rights activist, described the diamond industry in his 2006 Angola's Deadly Diamonds report as plagued by "murders, beatings, arbitrary detentions and other human rights violations." Marques called on foreign countries to boycott Angola's "conflict diamonds". In December 2014, the Bureau of International Labor Affairs issued a List of Goods Produced by Child Labor or Forced Labor that classified Angola as one of the major diamond-producing African countries relying on both child labor and forced labor. The U.S. Department of Labor reported that "there is little publicly available information on [Angola's] efforts to enforce child labor law". Diamonds accounted for 1.48% of Angolan exports in 2014.

Iron

Under Portuguese rule, Angola began mining iron in 1957, producing 1.2 million tons in 1967 and 6.2 million tons by 1971. In the early 1970s, 70% of Portuguese Angola's iron exports went to Western Europe and Japan. After independence in 1975, the Angolan Civil War (1975–2002) destroyed most of the territory's mining infrastructure. The redevelopment of the Angolan mining industry started in the late 2000s.

See also
Banco Espírito Santo Angola
 United Nations Economic Commission for Africa

References

Further reading
McCormick, Shawn H. The Angolan Economy: Prospects for Growth in a Postwar Environment, 1994.
OECD, International Energy Agency. Angola: Towards an Energy Strategy, 2006.

External links

MBendi overview of Angola
Angola latest trade data on ITC Trade Map
Exports to Angola Datasheet

 
Angola
Blood diamonds
Angola
Angola